Doug Irwin is a luthier, best known as the designer of 5 custom guitars for Jerry Garcia of the Grateful Dead. The guitars he built for Garcia included 
Eagle (Alembic),
Wolf,
Tiger,
Wolf Jr. (headless) and 
Rosebud.

Doug also built more than 50 other guitars and basses including a bass for Pete Sears and a bass for Phil Lesh.  Two other guitars are documented as being built by Irwin: Rosewood and a Les Paul type guitar.  These two guitars appear in the one and only D. Irwin Guitar Company sales brochure.

After the death of Jerry Garcia in 1995, Jerry's will directed that his Irwin-made guitars be returned to Doug Irwin.  After a legal battle with the remaining members of the Grateful Dead, the parties settled and agreed that Doug would receive "Wolf" and "Tiger" and GD Productions would keep "Rosebud" and "Wolf Jr." (Wolf Jr. is sometimes referred to as "headless" and was never played by Jerry in concert).  In the agreement Doug was to sell Tiger and Wolf at auction.  Wolf went for $789,500 including the buyer's premium, Tiger sold for $957,500 including the buyer's premium.  It is believed that at the time, Tiger's price was the highest ever paid for a guitar at auction.

Eagle, the first guitar that Doug Irwin built under his own name, and the first Irwin guitar purchased by Jerry Garcia was auctioned via Bonhams on May 8, 2007, for $186,000, inclusive of the buyer's premium.

External Website
Doug Irwin Official Website

References

Guitar makers
Year of birth missing (living people)
Living people